Lucy Herbert  may refer to:

Lucy Somerset (c.1524–1583), served two queens including her stepmother-in-law, Katherine Parr
Lady Lucy Herbert (1669–1743/44), English aristocrat, canoness regular and devotional writer
Lucy Herbert, Countess of Powis (1793–1875)